Christian Ramirez Diaz (born 8 August 1978) is a Mexican football coach and retired player who played as a defender.

Ramirez stands at 5'8 and weighs 178 lbs. He wears jersey #13. His only match for Chivas was as a start in Clausura 2006, against Monarcas Morelia. He played until the 75th minute, when he received a direct red card for a rough slide tackle. Ramirez played one match in the Clausura playoffs. He was called up from the Chivas "farm team", Chivas Coras Tepic, when 6 star players went to the Mexico National Team.

He is a journeyman player, whose career dates from 2000. His inaugural professional team was Pumas in Invierno 2000-2001. During Vernano 2000-2001, he was shipped to Toluca. He returned to Pumas for Invierno 2001-2002 and continued in Verano. He was traded to Toluca for Apertura 2002-2003, then went to Morelia. In Apertura 2003-2004, he was traded to América. He would be sent down to play with América's Primera A team. Clausura 2004-2005 found him traded to its rival club, Chivas.

His career stats are: of 158 matches he started in 142 while being substituted 16 times, played 12,480 minutes, 4 goals, 1 own goal, 40 yellow cards, and 5 red cards.

External links
 

1978 births
Living people
Footballers from Mexico City
Club Universidad Nacional footballers
Deportivo Toluca F.C. players
Atlético Morelia players
Club América footballers
Atlante F.C. footballers
C.D. Guadalajara footballers
Mexico under-20 international footballers
Association football defenders
Mexican footballers